Charlotte Verity, Lady Le Brun (born 1954) is a painter living and working in London, UK. A monograph on her work, Charlotte Verity was published by Ridinghouse, in November 2016.

Biography 
Born in Germany, Verity attended the Slade School of Art from 1973 to 1977, and won a Slade prize in her final year. In 1978 she was awarded a Boise travelling scholarship to study in Italy. 

Since then, Verity has been a regular exhibitor in group shows including, John Moores Painting Prize, the Whitechapel Gallery Open, the Hayward Annual, Discerning Eye and the Royal Academy’s Summer Exhibition. She had solo exhibitions with Anne Berthoud Gallery (1984, 1988, 1990) and Browse and Darby (1998, 2002, 2007); and more recently with Purdy Hicks, London (2016), the Garden Museum, London (2011 and 2018)  and the New Art Centre, Wiltshire (2019).  

In 2001, Verity began teaching at the Royal Drawing School in London where she remains on the faculty. In 2010, she was commissioned by Sir John Soane’s Museum to paint a portrait of its former Director, Margaret Richardson. A monograph on her work, Charlotte Verity, was published by Ridinghouse, in November 2016 with texts by artist Garry Fabian Miller, art historian Paul Hills, and artist Edmund de Waal.

Verity had residencies at the Towner Art Gallery in Eastbourne and was artist-in-residence at the Garden Museum  

Since 2001, Verity has taught at the Royal Drawing School in London. Her work is in many public collections including the Arts Council Collection, UK; Deutsche Bank; the Garden Museum, London; Museum of Contemporary Art, San Diego; Sir John Soane's Museum, London; Tate Education, London; and University College London.

Verity is married to artist Sir Christopher Le Brun and they have three children.

Public collections 
 Arthur Anderson & Co
 Arts Council England
 Derby Museum and Art Gallery
 Deutsche Bank
 Eastern Arts Association
 Electra Investment Trust
 Garden Museum, London
 Museum of Contemporary Art San Diego
 Paintings in Hospitals, UK
 St George's Hospital, London
 Sir John Soane's Museum
 Stanhope Properties
 Tate Education
 Unilever
 University College London
 Westminster School

References

External links 
 
Biography. Accessed 16 January 2023.

1954 births
Living people
20th-century British painters
20th-century British women artists
20th-century English women
21st-century British painters
21st-century British women artists
21st-century English women
Alumni of the Slade School of Fine Art
English women painters
Wives of knights